Goth Cruise is a 2009 British documentary television film directed by Jeanie Finlay.

The film follows 150 American and British goths as they travel around the Caribbean in the 4th annual Goth Cruise.  The documentary explores the enduring goth subculture, its allure, and what it really means to be goth.

References

External links
 Annual Goth Cruise Website
 Director's Website

2009 television films
2009 films
British television films
British independent films
British documentary films
Goth subculture
2009 documentary films
2000s English-language films
2000s British films